Serbia and Montenegro participated in the Eurovision Song Contest 2005 with the song "Zauvijek moja" written by Milan Perić and Slaven Knezović. The song was performed by the band No Name. The union of public broadcasters of Serbia and Montenegro, Udruženje javnih radija i televizija (UJRT) organised the national final Evropesma-Europjesma 2005 in order to select the Serbian and Montenegrin entry for the 2005 contest in Kyiv, Ukraine. The Serbian national broadcaster, Radio Television of Serbia (RTS), and the Montenegrin broadcaster Radio i televizija Crne Gore (RTCG) each submitted twelve entries from their respective selections Beovizija 2005 and Montevizija 2005 with twenty-four entries in total competing in the national final on 4 March 2005. "Zauvijek moja" performed by No Name was selected as the winner following the combination of votes from an eight-member jury panel and a public televote.

As one of ten highest placed finishers in the 2004 contest Serbia and Montenegro directly qualified to compete in the final of the Eurovision Song Contest which took place on 21 May 2005. Performing in position 12, Serbia and Montenegro placed seventh out of the 24 participating countries with 137 points.

Background 

Prior to the 2005 Contest, Serbia and Montenegro had participated in the Eurovision Song Contest one time. The first Serbian and Montenegrin entry in 2004, "Lane moje" performed by Željko Joksimović, placed second in the final. The union of public broadcasters of Serbia and Montenegro, Udruženje javnih radija i televizija (UJRT), organises the selection process for the nation's entry with Serbia and Montenegro's respective broadcasters, Radio Television of Serbia (RTS) and Radio i televizija Crne Gore (RTCG), broadcasting the event within their respective republics. UJRT confirmed their intentions to participate at the 2005 Eurovision Song Contest on 14 November 2004. The Evropesma-Europjesma national final had been used in 2004 in order to select their entry, a procedure that continued for the selection of the 2005 entry as announced along with their participation confirmation.

Before Eurovision

Beovizija 2005 
Beovizija 2005 was the 3rd edition of Beovizija. Jelena Tomašević won Beovizija 2005 with the song Jutro, written by Željko Joksimović and Aleksandra Milutinović. She received 78 points from the jury and the maximum 12 points by SMS and televoting. The hosts were actors Slobodan Ninković and Jelena Jovičić, who sang many former Eurovision Song Contest hits as a tribute to 50th anniversary of the event.

Montevizija 2005 
Montevizija 2005 was the first edition of Montevizija, a Montenegrin pop music festival that was the Montenegrin semifinal for choosing the Serbo-Montenegrin entry for Eurovision Song Contest 2005 in Kyiv, Ukraine. The final was held on 2 March 2005 in Podgorica and presented by Andrija Milošević, Žana Gardašević and Anđela Nenadović. Twenty-four songs competed and nine juries – 8 jury members and a public televote determined the ten songs to progress to the final of Evropjesma.

Evropesma-Europjesma 2005 
Evropesma-Europjesma 2005 was national final organised by UJRT in order to select the Serbian and Monetengrin entry for the Eurovision Song Contest 2005. The competition took place at the RTCG studios in Podgorica on 4 March 2005, hosted by Andela Nenadović, Žana Gardašević and Andrija Milošević. The show was broadcast in Serbia on RTS1 and RTS Sat as well as streamed online via the broadcaster's website rts.co.yu, and in Montenegro on TVCG 1 and TVCG Sat.

Competing entries 
The two broadcasters in Serbia and Montenegro, Serbian broadcaster RTS and Montenegrin broadcaster RTCG, each conducted separate selections in order to select the twenty-four entries to proceed to the national final: RTS organised Beovizija 2005 on 19 February 2005 where twenty-three songs competed, while RTCG organised Montevizija 2005 on 2 March 2005 with twenty-four entries competing. The top fourteen entries from Beovizija 2005 and the top ten entries from Montevizija 2005 qualified for the national final. Shortly before the competition, "Sentimientos" performed by Luna, which was allocated to perform eleventh during the show, was withdrawn due to boycott.

Final 
The final took place on 4 March 2005 where twenty-three songs competed. The winner, "Zauvijek moja" performed by No Name, was decided by a combination of votes from a jury panel (8/9) and the Serbian and Montenegrin public via televoting (1/9). The Serbian jury consisted of Ognjen Popović (musician and composer), Petar Ivanović (conductor and professor at the Music Academy in Belgrade), Silvana Ružić-Grujić (RTS music editor and music critic) and Biljana Arsić-Krstić (musician), while the Montenegrin jury consisted of Marina Tuca (singer and music professor), Zoran Živković (producer and artistic director), Tonči Petrović (composer) and Tijana Jovović (music professor and critic). Eurovision contestants Constantinos Christoforou, who would represent Cyprus in 2005, and Martin Vučić, who would represent Macedonia in 2005, were featured as guest performers during the show.

Controversy 
During the voting of Evropesma-Europjesma 2005, the Montenegrin jurors did not award any points to the Serbian Beovizija 2005 winner and runner-up, Jelena Tomašević and Ogi. The probable partisan feeling that led to such a polarised outcome may be partly attributable to the fallout from earlier disputes, including a breach of the rules regarding the active airplay of the Serbian acts before the competition and that the Serbian jurors did not award any points to the Montenegrin acts in Evropesma-Europjesma 2004.

On 7 March, former Serbian and Montenegrin Eurovision contestant and composer of Tomašević's song, Željko Joksimović, released a statement expressing his dissatisfaction towards the voting process as "the songs from Serbia were outvoted in a deeply unfair manner", while RTCG responded by stating that they did not influence the voting in any way. Plagiarism claims were also made towards "Zauvijek moja" as the introduction of the song was taken from the unofficial hymn of the Liberal Party of Montenegro titled "Poljem se vije". Following an investigation by the European Broadcasting Union (EBU), the Eurovision Song Contest Reference Group concluded that "Zauvijek moja" was eligible for the contest.

At Eurovision
According to Eurovision rules, all nations with the exceptions of the host country, the "Big Four" (France, Germany, Spain and the United Kingdom) and the twelve highest placed finishers in the 2004 contest are required to qualify from the semi-final in order to compete for the final; the top ten countries from the semi-final progress to the final. As Serbia and Montenegro finished second in the 2004 contest, the nation automatically qualified to compete in the final on 21 May 2005. On 22 March 2005, a special allocation draw was held which determined the running order for the semi-final and final, and Serbia and Montenegro was set to perform in position 12 in the final, following the entry from Israel and before the entry from Denmark. Serbia and Montenegro placed seventh in the final, scoring 137 points.

The semi-final and the final were broadcast in Serbia on RTS1 and RTS Sat with commentary by Duška Vučinić-Lučić, and in Montenegro on TVCG 2 and TVCG Sat with commentary for the semi-final by Dražen Bauković and Tamara Ivanković, and commentary for the final by Danijel Popović who represented Yugoslavia in the Eurovision Song Contest 1983. The Serbian and Montenegrin spokesperson, who announced the Serbian and Montenegrin votes during the final, was Nina Radulović.

Voting 
Below is a breakdown of points awarded to Serbia and Montenegro and awarded by Serbia and Montenegro in the semi-final and grand final of the contest. The nation awarded its 12 points to Croatia in the semi-final and to Greece in the final of the contest.

Points awarded to Serbia and Montenegro

Points awarded by Serbia and Montenegro

References

2005
Countries in the Eurovision Song Contest 2005
Eurovision
Eurovision